Apamea macronephra is a moth of the family Noctuidae first described by Emilio Berio in 1959. It is found on Madagascar.

This species has a wingspan of 51 mm.

References

Moths described in 1959
Apamea (moth)
Moths of Madagascar